Vinícius Farias Locatelli (born 23 March 1998), known as Vini Locatelli, is a Brazilian professional footballer who plays as a midfielder for Ponte Preta, on loan from Ferroviária.

Club career

Chapecoense
Born in Campo Grande, Mato Grosso do Sul, Locatelli joined Chapecoense's youth setup in 2015, aged 16. Promoted to the main squad for the 2019 campaign, he made his senior debut on 24 February of that year, coming on as a half-time substitute for Alan Ruschel in a 0–2 Campeonato Catarinense away loss against Marcílio Dias.

Locatelli scored his first goal as a professional on 31 March 2019, netting his team's second in a 2–0 home win against Brusque. He made his Série A debut on 14 September by replacing Elicarlos in a 1–2 home loss against Vasco da Gama, and scored his first goal in the category on 8 December in a 1–1 away draw against the same opponent.

On 11 March 2020, Locatelli renewed his contract with Chape until the end of 2022. During that campaign, he also helped the club to win the Catarinense and the Série B.

Ferroviária
On 7 February 2021, Locatelli agreed to a contract with Ferroviária. Chapecoense retained a percentage over a future sale.

Ponte Preta (loan)
On 22 February 2021, however, Locatelli joined Ponte Preta until the end of the year. He was a regular starter in the club's 2021 Campeonato Paulista campaign, featuring in 13 matches.

Career statistics

Honours
Chapecoense
Campeonato Catarinense: 2020
Campeonato Brasileiro Série B: 2020

References

External links

1998 births
Living people
People from Campo Grande
Brazilian footballers
Association football midfielders
Campeonato Brasileiro Série A players
Campeonato Brasileiro Série B players
Associação Chapecoense de Futebol players
Associação Ferroviária de Esportes players
Associação Atlética Ponte Preta players
Sportspeople from Mato Grosso do Sul
Brazilian people of Italian descent